The enzyme octadecanal decarbonylase catalyzes the chemical reaction

octadecanal  heptadecane + CO

This enzyme belongs to the family of lyases, specifically in the "catch-all" class of carbon-carbon lyases.  The systematic name of this enzyme class is octadecanal alkane-lyase. Other names in common use include decarbonylase, and aldehyde decarbonylase.  At least one compound, EDTA is known to inhibit this enzyme.

References

 

EC 4.1.99
Enzymes of unknown structure